Guy Joseph Guzzone (born March 27, 1964) is an American politician who represents District 13 in the Maryland State Senate. He was sworn into the State Senate on January 14, 2015, where he serves as Chairman of the Budget and Taxation Committee. He is the former Senate Chair of the Howard County Delegation, as well as a former member of the Maryland House of Delegates and former chairman of the Howard County Council.

Background
Senator Guzzone was born in Baltimore, Maryland, March 27, 1964. He attended Parkville High School in Baltimore County and graduated from the  University of Maryland  with two B.A.s, one in economics and the other in government & politics in 1986.  He later earned a M.P.M. in public management in 1988.

Public Service
Guzzone currently serves as the State Senator representing District 13. He serves as Chairman of the Senate Budget and Taxation Committee. Previously, Guzzone was elected to the Maryland House of Delegates in 2006 and re-elected in 2010. He served on the Appropriations Committee and was Chairman of its Public Safety subcommittee. As House Chairman of the Howard County Delegation, Guy secured funding for many Howard County projects including the James and Anne Robinson Nature Center, Carroll Baldwin Hall, and Troy Hill and Blandair Parks. From 1998 to 2006, he served as a Howard County Councilman. He served as 2018 Chair of the County Executive-elect Transition Team for Howard County.

In the Legislature
Guzzone has been a member of the State Senate since January 2015. Prior to that, he was a member of the House of Delegates since January 10, 2007, where he served as Deputy Majority Whip, Chair of the Howard County Delegation, Chair of the Joint Audit Committee, and on the House Appropriations Committee and its Capital Budget and Education and Economic Development subcommittees, the Oversight Committee on Personnel, the Joint Committee on the Management of Public Funds, the House Emergency Medical Services Work Group, and the House Regional Revitalization Work Group.

Legislative notes
 voted in favor of Slots (HB4) in the 2007 Special session

Election results

General election results, 2006
2006 Race for Maryland House of Delegates – 13th District
Voters to choose three:
{| class="wikitable"
|-
!Name
!Votes
!Percent
!Outcome
|-
|- 
|Guy Guzzone, Democratic
|26,891
|  22.3%
|   Won
|-
|- 
|Shane Pendergrass, Democratic
|26,633 
|  22.1%
|   Won
|-
|- 
|Frank S. Turner, Democratic
|24,437
|  20.3%
|   Won
|-
|- 
|Mary Beth Tung, Republican
|15,216 
|  12.6%
|   Lost
|-
|- 
|Rick Bowers, Republican
|13,665
|  11.4%
|   Lost
|-
|- 
|Loretta Gaffney, Republican
|13,466
|  11.2%
|   Lost
|-
|- 
|other write-ins
|84
|  0.1%
|   Lost
|-
|}
 2010 Race for Maryland House of Delegates – 13th District

 2014 Race for Maryland Senate – 13th District

 2018 Race for Maryland Senate – 13th District

References

1964 births
2008 United States presidential electors
21st-century American politicians
Living people
Democratic Party Maryland state senators
Democratic Party members of the Maryland House of Delegates
People from Columbia, Maryland
University of Maryland, College Park alumni